Adam Bomb (born 1963) is an American guitarist and singer.

Adam Bomb may also refer to:
 Adam Bomb (wrestler), ring name of Bryan Clark (born 1964)
 Adam Bomb, internet comic strip character created by Andy Fish and Tony Antetomaso
 Adam Bomb, Garbage Pail Kids trading card